Sorpe is a locality and decentralized municipal entity located in the municipality of Alt Àneu, in Province of Lleida province, Catalonia, Spain. As of 2020, it has a population of 42.

Geography 
Sorpe is located 168km north-northeast of Lleida.

References

Populated places in the Province of Lleida